The  is a 43.0 km Japanese railway line operated by the third-sector railway operator Tosa Kuroshio Railway. It connects Kubokawa Station in the town of Shimanto with Nakamura Station in the city of Shimanto in Kōchi Prefecture.

Stations

History
The first section of the line, from Kobokawa to Tosa-Saga was opened by Japanese National Railways (JNR) on 18 December 1963, and operated using diesel trains, functioning as an extension of the Dosan Line. The section from Tosa-Saga to Nakamura opened on 1 October 1970.

Freight operations ceased in 1984, and from 1 April 1988, operation of the line was transferred to the Tosa Kuroshio Railway. With the opening of the Tosa Kuroshio Railway Sukumo Line in October 1997, the maximum line speed was raised from 85 km/h to 110 km/h.

See also
 List of railway lines in Japan

References

Rail transport in Kōchi Prefecture
1067 mm gauge railways in Japan
Railway lines opened in 1963
Japanese third-sector railway lines